The Coatesville Area School District (CASD) covers the City of Coatesville, the Boroughs of Modena and South Coatesville, and Caln Township, East Fallowfield Township, Sadsbury Township, Valley Township, West Brandywine Township and West Caln Township in Chester County, Pennsylvania. According to census data recorded between 2010 and 2019, Coatesville Area School District served a resident population of approximately 64,700.  The district operates Coatesville Area Senior High School (10th-12th), Coatesville Area Intermediate High School (8th-9th), North Brandywine Middle School (7th), Scott 6th Grade Center, Caln Elementary School (K-5th), East Fallowfield Elementary School (K-5th), King's Highway Elementary School (K-5th), Rainbow Elementary School (K-5th), and Reeceville Elementary School (K-5th).

Coatesville Area School District serves the only city in Chester County (the wealthiest county in Pennsylvania) as well as the city’s surrounding boroughs and townships. The district has long been the center of the Coatesville community and prides itself as being rich in diversity. Not only does Coatesville serve the most diverse school district in Chester County, but it also ranks the 3rd most diverse in Pennsylvania and 29th in the United States.

History and Overview
The first school established and recorded in Coatesville was the Moses Coates School in 1789 which was run by Sallie Coats until 1814 when Joseph Ridgeway donated the land and building off the corner of third & Harmony (now MLK Drive) to the newly established “Trustees of Coatesville School Association”.  They named the school The Valley School but was also known as the Little Red School House.

Schools
Primary Schools
Caln Elementary School
East Fallowfield Elementary School
King's Highway Elementary School
Rainbow Elementary School
Reeceville Elementary School

Secondary Schools
Scott 6th Grade Center
North Brandywine Middle School
Coatesville Area Intermediate High School
Coatesville Area Senior High School

Former Schools
Friendship Elementary School (closed 2018)
South Brandywine Middle School (closed 2018)

Athletics
Coatesville Area School District is ranked 7th in best school districts for athletes in Pennsylvania. Coatesville Area Senior High School joined the Pennsylvania Interscholastic Athletic Association (PIAA) in 1922. In 1950, the Ches-Mont League was formed. This league originally compromised eight schools in Chester County. Coatesville (National Division) is the only original member still part of the league today.

PIAA Championships
 1936 Swim Team won the District One Swim Title
 1937 Swim Team won the District One Swim Title
 1941 The Boys Basketball Team won Championships 
 1941 Girls Tennis Team won District Champions.
 1941 Boys Tennis Team won Section II Champions
 1943 Swim Team won the District One Swim Title
 2000-01 Boys Basketball
 1993-94 Girls Basketball

Ches-Mont Champions
 1950 Track and field won the Ches-Mont League Championships
 1950 Cross country  (boys) Ches-Mont Championship

Board of School Directors 

The nine members of the board are elected at-large that serve 4-year terms. They are elected by voters in Region I (Coatesville City & Valley Township), Region II (Caln & West Brandywine), and Region III (East Fallowfield, Sadsbury, Modena, South Coatesville & West Caln).
 Rob Fisher, President
 Tom Keech, Vice President
 Andy Finkbohner
 Becky Harlan
 Mary Harris
 James Bookman
 Henry Assettoo
 Amelia Mills
 Josh Crans

Significant Events

In August 2013, district superintendent Richard Como and athletics director Jim Donato left their jobs following the discovery of racist text messages on their district-provided mobile phones. Both were arrested in 2014 on charges of theft and state ethics violations. Donato pleaded guilty in June, 2016 with an agreement to pay restitution to the district for the $15,000 he admitted stealing.  March 18, 2018 Chester County Common Pleas Judge Thomas G. Gavin sentenced Richard Wallace Como to a jail term in Chester County Prison of three to 23 months, followed by three years of probation, on the charges that he was found guilty of at trial in January – dealing in unlawful proceeds, theft by unlawful taking, theft by failure to make required disposition of funds, and conflict of interest.

Angelo Romaniello Jr. had been appointed acting superintendent following Como's departure, following which Taschner was voted in by the board in a 7–2 vote for a five-year contract running July 1, 2017 through June 30, 2022. Taschner resigned on (Tue, approx Aug 15, 2019).

References

External links

 Coatesville Area School District
May 19, 2018: Municipal officials, lawmakers urge re-evaluation of planned massive Coatesville tax hike; vote set May 29
March 16, 2018 Ex-Superintendent Como sentenced to prison for theft of school funds
June 27, 2017 Master Facility Planning 
May 26, 2016 Report: Coatesville school a ‘war zone,’ with numerous fights each day

School districts in Chester County, Pennsylvania